The 1986 Seiko Super Tennis Hong Kong, also known as the Hong Kong Open, was a men's tennis tournament played on indoor hard courts at the Victoria Park Tennis Centre in Hong Kong that was part of the 1986 Nabisco Grand Prix tennis ciruit. It was the 14th edition of the tournament and was held from 27 October through 2 November 1986. Seventh-seeded Ramesh Krishnan won the singles title.

Finals

Singles

 Ramesh Krishnan defeated  Andrés Gómez 7–6(9–7), 6–0, 7–5
 It was Krishnan's 2nd singles title of the year and the 5th of his career.

Doubles

 Mike De Palmer /  Gary Donnelly defeated  Pat Cash /  Mark Kratzmann 7–6, 6–7, 7–5

References

External links
 ITF tournament edition details

Seiko Super Tennis Hong Kong
Hong Kong Open (tennis)
1986 in Hong Kong sport